Heart of Antalya is a ferris wheel located in the Aktur Park in Konyaaltı, Antalya, Turkey completed and opened in 2019. With the wheel's 94 meter of diameter, it is the largest ferris wheel in Turkey and after the London Eye, the second largest in Europe. It has forty-six cabins and a ride takes eighteen minutes. The components were imported from China and assembled in eight months in Turkey.

References 

Ferris wheels
Buildings and structures completed in 2019
Buildings and structures in Antalya
21st-century architecture in Turkey